Edward Jackamonis (October 19, 1939–January 22, 2006) was a Wisconsin legislator and educator.

Born in New Britain, Connecticut, Jackamonis graduated from Northeastern University. Moving to Wisconsin, he received his master's degree from the University of Wisconsin–Madison and then taught at the University of Wisconsin–Waukesha. From 1971 to 1983, Jackamonis served as a Democratic member of the Wisconsin State Assembly, the last six years as speaker.

References

Politicians from New Britain, Connecticut
Politicians from Waukesha, Wisconsin
Northeastern University alumni
University of Wisconsin–Madison alumni
1939 births
2006 deaths
20th-century American politicians
Democratic Party members of the Wisconsin State Assembly